The women's snowboard cross competition of the FIS Freestyle Ski and Snowboarding World Championships 2017 was held at Sierra Nevada, Spain on March 10 (qualifying)  and March 12 (finals). 
28 athletes from 12 countries competed.

Qualification
The following are the results of the qualification.

Elimination round
The following are the results of the elimination round.

Quarterfinals

Heat 1

Heat 2

Heat 3

Heat 4

Semifinals

Heat 1

Heat 2

Finals

Small Finals

Big Finals

References

Snowboard cross, women's